The 1964 Seton Hall Pirates baseball team represented Seton Hall University in the 1964 NCAA University Division baseball season. The Pirates played their home games at Owen T. Carroll Field. The team was coached by Ownie Carroll in his 17th year as head coach at Seton Hall.

The Pirates won the District V Playoff to advance to the College World Series, where they were defeated by the Missouri Tigers.

Roster

Schedule

|-
! style="" | Regular Season
|-

|-
! bgcolor="#DDDDFF" width="3%" | #
! bgcolor="#DDDDFF" width="7%" | Date
! bgcolor="#DDDDFF" width="14%" | Opponent
! bgcolor="#DDDDFF" width="25%" | Site/Stadium
! bgcolor="#DDDDFF" width="5%" | Score
! bgcolor="#DDDDFF" width="5%" | Overall Record
|- align="center" bgcolor="#ccffcc"
|  || April 9 || at  || Unknown • Piscataway, New Jersey || 6–5 || –
|- align="center" bgcolor="#ccffcc"
|  || April 21 ||  || Owen T. Carroll Field • South Orange, New Jersey || 5–4 || –
|- align="center" bgcolor="#ccffcc"
|  || April 25 ||  || Owen T. Carroll Field • South Orange, New Jersey || 1–0 || –
|- align="center" bgcolor="#ccffcc"
|  ||  || at  || Unknown • Annapolis, Maryland || 6–4 || –

|-
! bgcolor="#DDDDFF" width="3%" | #
! bgcolor="#DDDDFF" width="7%" | Date
! bgcolor="#DDDDFF" width="14%" | Opponent
! bgcolor="#DDDDFF" width="25%" | Site/Stadium
! bgcolor="#DDDDFF" width="5%" | Score
! bgcolor="#DDDDFF" width="5%" | Overall Record
|- align="center" bgcolor="#ffcccc"
|  ||  ||  || Unknown • Unknown || 2–3 || –
|- align="center" bgcolor="#ccffcc"
|  || May 9 || at Villanova || Unknown • Unknown || 2–3 || –
|- align="center" bgcolor="#ccffcc"
|  || May 19 || at  || Unknown • Newark, Delaware || 4–2 || –
|- align="center" bgcolor="#ccffcc"
|  || May 21 ||  || Owen T. Carroll Field • South Orange, New Jersey || 5–2 || –
|- align="center" bgcolor="#ccffcc"
|  || May 2 || at St. John's || Alley Pond Park • New York, New York || 3–2 || –
|- align="center" bgcolor="#ccffcc"
| 25 || May 27 || at  || Doubleday Field • West Point, New York || 13–6 || 22–3
|-

|-
! style="" | Postseason
|-

|-
! bgcolor="#DDDDFF" width="3%" | #
! bgcolor="#DDDDFF" width="7%" | Date
! bgcolor="#DDDDFF" width="14%" | Opponent
! bgcolor="#DDDDFF" width="25%" | Site/Stadium
! bgcolor="#DDDDFF" width="5%" | Score
! bgcolor="#DDDDFF" width="5%" | Overall Record
|- align="center" bgcolor="#ccffcc"
| 26 || May 29 || vs  || Bill Clarke Field • Princeton, New Jersey || 8–3 || 23–3
|- align="center" bgcolor="#ccffcc"
| 27 || May 30 || vs Ithaca || Bill Clarke Field • Princeton, New Jersey || 8–3 || 24–3
|-

|-
! bgcolor="#DDDDFF" width="3%" | #
! bgcolor="#DDDDFF" width="7%" | Date
! bgcolor="#DDDDFF" width="14%" | Opponent
! bgcolor="#DDDDFF" width="25%" | Site/Stadium
! bgcolor="#DDDDFF" width="5%" | Score
! bgcolor="#DDDDFF" width="5%" | Overall Record
|- align="center" bgcolor="#ffcccc"
| 28 || June 8 || vs  || Omaha Municipal Stadium • Omaha, Nebraska || 1–5 || 24–4
|- align="center" bgcolor="#ccffcc"
| 29 || June 10 || vs Texas A&M || Omaha Municipal Stadium • Omaha, Nebraska || 14–5 || 25–4
|- align="center" bgcolor="#ffcccc"
| 30 || June 13 || vs Missouri || Omaha Municipal Stadium • Omaha, Nebraska || 1–3 || 25–5
|-

|-
|

References

Seton Hall Pirates baseball seasons
Seton Hall Pirates baseball
College World Series seasons
1964 Metropolitan Intercollegiate Conference baseball season